Graham Liptrot (born 8 July 1955), also known by the nickname of "Lippy", is an English former professional rugby league footballer who played in the 1970s and 1980s.

Playing career

International honours
Graham Liptrot won caps for England while at St. Helens in 1979 against Wales, and France.

Challenge Cup Final appearances
Graham Liptrot played  in St. Helens' 18-19 defeat by Halifax in the 1987 Challenge Cup Final during the 1986–87 season at Wembley Stadium, London on Saturday 2 May 1987.

County Cup Final appearances
Graham Liptrot played  in St. Helens 0-16 defeat by Warrington in the 1982 Lancashire Cup Final during the 1982–83 season at Central Park, Wigan on Saturday 23 October 1982, and played  in the 28-16 victory over Wigan in the 1984 Lancashire Cup Final during the 1984–85 season at Central Park, Wigan on Sunday 28 October 1984.

BBC2 Floodlit Trophy Final appearances
Graham Liptrot played  in  St. Helens' 11-26 defeat by Hull Kingston Rovers in the 1977 BBC2 Floodlit Trophy Final during the 1977–78 season at Craven Park, Kingston upon Hull on Tuesday 13 December 1977, and played  in the 7-13 defeat by Widnes in the 1978 BBC2 Floodlit Trophy Final during the 1978–79 season at Knowsley Road, St. Helens on Tuesday 12 December 1978.

BBC2 Floodlit Trophy Final appearances
Graham Liptrot's testimonial match for St. Helens took place against Mansfield Marksman at Knowsley Road, St Helens, Merseyside on Sunday 19 August 1984.

References

External links

1955 births
Living people
England national rugby league team players
English rugby league players
Lancashire rugby league team players
Rugby league hookers
Rugby league players from St Helens, Merseyside
St Helens R.F.C. players